Bharaate is a 2019 Indian Kannada-language action drama film written and directed by Chethan Kumar. The film is produced by Suprith under the Sri Jagadguru Movies banner and presented by Sriimurali under Aagastya Enterprises. It features Sriimurali and Sree Leela in lead roles. Sriimurali plays a dual role for the first time in his career.

The supporting cast includes Tara, Rangayana Raghu, Giri Shivanna, Avinash, Sarath Lohithaswa, Sai Kumar, P. Ravi Shankar, Ayyapa P. Sharma, and Sadhu Kokila. The score and soundtrack for the film are composed by Arjun Janya, and the cinematography was done by Girish R. Gowda. It was edited by Deepu S. Kumar.

Plot
Jagan is a tourist guide in Jodhpur, Rajasthan and also an Ayurvedic practitioner. Radha is a tourist who visits Jodhpur with her friends and subsequently tries to commit suicide at Mehrangarh. She is stopped by Jagan, who manages to convince her to enjoy her trip instead. Radha eventually leaves the city without saying goodbye to her saviour. Later, Jagan's mother takes her son to Badami to perform a puja, and there the young man meets Radha once more.

At the bus station, when Jagan attempts to propose to Radha, she is attacked by Veerappa henchmen, but Jagan rescues her, whereupon she reveals that she is from Ballala's family and that her father will not accept the marriage proposal. Jagan consoles her and promises to convince her family. He arrives at their village just in time to thwart attackers sent by Pallava, another of Ballala's rivals.

On a separate occasion, during the festival of Durga Puja, the Ballala family is again engaged in a conflict with a rival group, and Jagan once more intervenes. He confesses that his grandfather is a Rathnakara. The Ballala family then offers an alliance with the Rathnakaras by proposing the marriage of Ballala's brother to Rathnakara's daughter, who rejects the proposal. Dejected and angry, Ballala's brother attacks everyone at the Ratnakara residence in an attempt to kill the daughter that was offered to him. He is accidentally slain by Jagan's father, however. In retaliation, Ballala slaughters the Rathnakaras, sparing only Jagan and his parents, but instructs them to depart.

The feuds between the four families continue, however, leading first to Radha's captivity, an ensuing gang battle, and ultimately, a truce. Jagan and Radha are finally reunited after many travails, and they receive everyone's approval to marry.

Cast
 Sriimurali in the dual role of Jagan Mohan and Jayaratnakara
 Sree Leela as Radha
 Tara as the mother of Jagan Mohan
 Rangayana Raghu as Patela
 Suman as Jagan Mohan's father
 Sai Kumar as Ballala
 P. Ravi Shankar as Pallava
 Ayyappa P. Sharma as Veerappa Nayaka
 Sharath Lohitashwa as Nayaka
 Alok as Rajastan guide
 Sadhu Kokila as Radha's uncle
 Manjunath Gowda and Raj Deepak Shetty as Radha's brothers

Production 

The film was announced on 21 June 2018, and principal photography began on 10 July 2018 in Rajasthan. After the success of Ugramm (2014), Rathaavara (2015), and Mufti (2017), Sriimurali announced his collaboration with Kumar. Sree Leela was cast as the heroine of the film. Arjun Janya was announced as the music director. The dubbing was completed on 18 June 2019.

Release
The film was released on 18 October 2019.

Box office
The movie earned ₹8.36 crore rupees on its first day. By the end of its theatrical run, it had grossed ₹12 crore. and completed 100 days at box office.

Soundtrack

The film's score and soundtrack are composed by Arjun Janya. Music rights were acquired by Ananda Audio.

Accolades

References

External links
 

2010s Kannada-language films
Indian action drama films
2019 action drama films
2019 films
Films shot in Mysore
Films shot in Bangalore
Films shot in Rajasthan
Films shot in Switzerland
2019 masala films
Indian romantic action films
Films directed by Chethan Kumar
Films scored by Arjun Janya